Hinterleiter is an unincorporated community in Maxatawny Township in Berks County, Pennsylvania, United States. Hinterleiter is located at the intersection of Hinterleiter and Quarry Roads.

References

Unincorporated communities in Berks County, Pennsylvania
Unincorporated communities in Pennsylvania